Kenneth Partridge (24 August 1926 – 7 December 2015) was an English interior designer, who created homes for two of the Beatles, and showrooms for fashion designers Hardy Amies and Norman Hartnell.

Partridge was born in Brockley, south London, the son of Sidney Partridge, an electrical engineer and factory manager, and his wife Dorothy (née Brown). He served as a Bevin Boy during World War II 

John Lennon bought Kenwood, St. George's Hill on 15 July 1964, and spent £40,000 on remodelling it, employing Partridge for the interior design, having admired his work at the Beatles' manager Brian Epstein's house.

References

1926 births
2015 deaths
People from Brockley
English interior designers
English LGBT people
Bevin Boys